The Men's 100 metres (T12) at the 2022 Commonwealth Games, as part of the athletics programme, took place in the Alexander Stadium on 3 and 4 August 2022.

Records
Prior to this competition, the existing world and Games records were as follows:

Schedule
The schedule was as follows:

All times are British Summer Time (UTC+1)

Results

First round
As the T12 was a combined class race, and T11 competitors' guides are allowed in the class, a maximum of four athletes can take part in each of two heats and the final.

First in each heat (Q) and the next 2 fastest (q) advance to the Final.

Wind: Heat 1: +0.2 m/s, Heat 2: +0.8 m/s

Final
The medals were determined in the final.

Wind: +3.7m/s

References

Men's 100 metres (T12)